Victorian Women's Suffrage Society was an Australian organization for women's suffrage, founded in 1884. It organized the struggle for women's suffrage in the State of Victoria in Australia. It was the first women's suffrage society in Australia. 

The organisation was founded by Henrietta Dugdale and Annie Lowe. Dugdale had started the campaign for women's suffrage in 1868, and the campaign was organized with the foundation of the organization. The purpose of the organization was 'To obtain the same political privileges for women as now possessed by male voters'. It was open for both male and female members. The state of Victoria introduced women's suffrage in 1908, last in Australia.

References

  https://www.womenaustralia.info/biogs/AWE0733b.htm
 Australian Dictionary of Biography
 Jennifer S. Uglow, Maggy Hendry, The Northeastern dictionary of women's biography

Women's suffrage in Australia
Organisations based in Victoria (Australia)
1884 establishments in Australia
Organizations established in 1884
19th century in Victoria (Australia)